Artyom Igorevich Popov (born 30 August 1992) is a Russian professional football player. He plays as a right winger for FC Rubin Kazan.

Club career
He made his Russian Premier League debut for PFC CSKA Moscow on 24 September 2011 in a game against FC Volga Nizhny Novgorod.

References

External links
 

1992 births
Sportspeople from Lipetsk
Living people
Russian footballers
Russia youth international footballers
Association football midfielders
PFC CSKA Moscow players
FC Lokomotiv Moscow players
FC Zenit-2 Saint Petersburg players
FC Tom Tomsk players
FC Orenburg players
FC Rotor Volgograd players
FC Nizhny Novgorod (2015) players
FC Baltika Kaliningrad players
FC Rubin Kazan players
Russian Premier League players
Russian First League players
Russian Second League players